Bullhorn is a cloud computing company headquartered in Boston, Massachusetts. The company provides customer relationship management (CRM), applicant tracking system (ATS) and operations software for the staffing industry. As of 2019, the company reported more than 11,000 customers in more than 150 countries. Besides its Boston headquarters, the company has operations in St. Louis, London, Brighton, Sydney, and Rotterdam.

History

Bullhorn was founded in 1999 by Roger Colvin, Barry Hinckley, and Art Papas. Papas continues to serve as CEO. The company originally launched as a platform for freelancers to find and collaborate on work, but in 2001 changed its focus to build CRM software for vertical markets.

The company has historically focused on providing software-as-a-service to third-party staffing and recruiting firms, allowing them to manage business operations on a single web-based platform. It became one of the largest providers of technology to the staffing and recruiting market, reportedly growing revenue from $2 million in 2004, to $20 million in 2009, $33.6 million in 2011, $40 million in 2012, and $67 million in 2013.

Bullhorn raised its first round of venture capital funding in 1999 with a $4 million investment from GE Asset Management and Internet.com. It then raised $26 million from General Catalyst Partners and Highland Capital Partners in 2008. In June 2012, Vista Equity Partners acquired Bullhorn for a reported price of several hundred million dollars.

By 2013, Bullhorn had 6,000 customers in 34 countries.

In July 2015, the industry research firm Gartner included Bullhorn for the first time in its Magic Quadrant report on salesforce automation alongside other companies that it deems to be leaders in providing tools to support the automation of sales and account management activities and processes.

In January, 2016, the company reported in a momentum press release that it would exceed nine figures in annual revenue for the first time in its history.

During Vista's ownership, the company quadrupled in revenue by focusing on serving the staffing and recruiting industry and acquiring several companies, including MaxHire Solutions, Sendouts, The Code Works, and EASY Software Solutions, makers of timeshEASY.

In April 2016, Bullhorn moved its Boston headquarters from the Ft. Point district to Downtown Crossing.

In June 2017 at its Engage conference, Bullhorn announced its new suite of software for healthcare staffing firms.

In September 2017, Bullhorn International acquired Connexys, a leading provider of recruitment solutions for mainland Europe, to supercharge its expansion into mainland Europe.

In October 2017, Insight Venture Partners acquired Bullhorn from Vista. The company also announced its cloud-based middle office strategy to provide enterprise recruiting companies with a front-to-back solution.

In November 2017, Bullhorn acquired Peoplenet, a leading provider of cloud-based workforce management solutions. The company also announced the official closing of Insight Venture Partners’ acquisition of Bullhorn, which included an investment from Genstar Capital.

In March 2018, Bullhorn acquired Talent Rover and Jobscience, two of the leading providers of recruitment software built on the Salesforce platform.

In November 2021, Bullhorn acquired Cube19.

References

Cloud computing providers
Companies based in Boston
Software companies established in 1999
Software companies based in Massachusetts
2012 mergers and acquisitions
Software companies of the United States
1999 establishments in Massachusetts